Christopher John Westwood (born 13 February 1977) is an English retired footballer.

Career

Wolverhampton Wanderers
Westwood began his career at Wolverhampton Wanderers, where he scored once against Portsmouth.

Reading
Westwood moved to Reading in 1998 but. First team chances at both clubs were limited and in his one season with the Berkshire club he didn't make a senior league appearance.

Hartlepool United
Westood moved at the beginning of the 1999–2000 season to Hartlepool United. Westwood was named in the PFA Division Three team of the year for the 2002–03 season, as Hartlepool won promotion to Division Two. Over the course of six seasons at Victoria Park, Westwood made 294 appearances in all competitions, scoring nine goals. Westwood's final appearance for Hartlepool was the 2004–05 Football League One play-off final. It did not end well for Westwood as he was sent off as his side went on to lose 4–2 to Sheffield Wednesday.

Walsall
He left Hartlepool at the end of the 2004–05 season after rejecting the offer of a new contract, instead opting to join Walsall on 1 July 2005. 
Westwood helped Walsall to promotion in the 2006–07 season, and was named in the PFA League Two Team of the Year.

Peterborough United
Westwood was signed by Peterborough United from Walsall on a three-year deal on 14 May 2007, and aided in the team's back-to-back promotions to League One and the Championship.

Cheltenham Town (loan)
On 6 January 2009, Westwood moved on an initial one-month loan to Cheltenham Town, which was later extended for a further month. Following Peterborough's promotion to the Championship, Westwood was placed on the transfer list.

Wycombe Wanderers
On 9 July 2009, Westwood signed a two-year contract with League One side Wycombe Wanderers after his contract with Peterborough was cancelled.

Wrexham
Westwood left Wycombe in June 2011 after rejecting their offer of a new contract and signed for Wrexham on a two-year deal. Westwood scored his first goal for Wrexham in a 2–2 draw against Grimsby Town. In March 2013 Westwood made his first appearance at Wembley Stadium in the FA Trophy Final which he won with Wrexham, beating Grimsby Town on penalties after the match ended 1–1, Westwood successfully converted a penalty in the shoot out. On 21 April Westwood was awarded the Wrexham player of the year award for the 2012–13 season.

On 13 May 2013, it was confirmed that Westwood would not be offered a new contract for the 2013–14 season.

Alfreton Town
Westwood join fellow Conference National side Alfreton Town on 5 July 2013, signing a one-year contract. He made his debut on the opening day of the season in a 1–0 defeat away to Dartford.

Hednesford Town

Westwood joined Hednesford Town in September 2014, making his debut against Stockport County FC on 6 September.

Halesowen Town 
Westwood joined Evo Slik Northern Premier League side Halesowen Town in August 2015.

Career statistics

Honours
Hartlepool United
Third Division runner-up: 2002–03

Walsall
League Two: 2006–07

Peterborough United
League One runner-up: 2008–09
League Two runner-up: 2007–08

Wrexham
FA Trophy: 2012–13

Individual
PFA Team of the Year: 2002–03 Third Division, 2006–07 League Two
Wrexham Player of the Year: 2012–13

References

External links
Chris Westwood profile at Alfreton Town F.C.

1977 births
Living people
Sportspeople from Dudley
English footballers
Association football defenders
Wolverhampton Wanderers F.C. players
Reading F.C. players
Hartlepool United F.C. players
Walsall F.C. players
Peterborough United F.C. players
Cheltenham Town F.C. players
Wycombe Wanderers F.C. players
Wrexham A.F.C. players
Alfreton Town F.C. players
Hednesford Town F.C. players
Halesowen Town F.C. players
English Football League players
National League (English football) players